Steven J. Lund (born October 30, 1953) is an American executive, attorney, and has been the 23rd Young Men General President of the Church of Jesus Christ of Latter-day Saints (LDS Church) since April 2020.

He worked as an attorney before co-founding and later becoming CEO of Utah-based Nu Skin Enterprises, a multilevel marketing company that develops and sells personal care products and dietary supplements.

Lund served as a full-time LDS Church missionary in the Netherlands Amsterdam Mission. He attended Brigham Young University, where he obtained both a degree in communications and a juris doctor degree from the J. Reuben Clark Law School. He served in the U.S. Army and was assigned to Frankfurt, Germany where he met his future wife.  

In 2012, Lund was a major donor to presidential candidate Mitt Romney and was connected to Eli Publishing Inc., a political action committee.

LDS Church service
Lund has served in the LDS Church as president of the Georgia Atlanta Mission, area seventy, and member of the Young Men general board.

In the LDS Church's October 2020 general conference, Lund gave an address centered on the faith of his 12-year-old son dying of cancer. In December 2020, Lund helped announce the creation of the new youth-based magazine, For the Strength of Youth and remarked, "We really need to place virtuous things front and center in our lives".

Personal life
Lund married Kalleen Kirk in 1980 and they have four children. He is a former regent of the Utah System of Higher Education.

References

External links
Steven J. Lund Official profile
Steven J. Lund Nu Skin profile

American leaders of the Church of Jesus Christ of Latter-day Saints
General Presidents of the Young Men (organization)
Living people
1953 births
Latter Day Saints from Utah
Brigham Young University alumni
J. Reuben Clark Law School alumni